is a Survival Horror text-based visual novel for the Super Famicom that was released in 1995 by Banpresto exclusively in Japan. The in-game graphics make use of digitized photographs.

In 1996, a remake for the PlayStation, "Gakkou de atta Kowai Hanashi S", was released. It featured improved graphics, full motion video, and a drastically expanded story.

The game was developed by Pandora Box , a studio founded by game designer and scenario writer Takeo Iijima. The characters and setting would later be used in the Apathy franchise of Visual and Sound Novel games.

Gameplay 
In the game you play as a reporter for the school paper, writing a story about the 7 School Mysteries. Each mystery is told to you by one of 6 possible other students. As you make your way through each scenario, you are given choices which will change the outcome of the story and therefore your progression through the game. Including hidden stories, there are more than 50 possible scenarios in the game.

Characters

Main characters 
Shuichi Sakagami (坂上 修一 Sakagami Shuichi)
Emi Kurata (倉田 恵美 Kurata Emi)
Mayumi Taguchi (田口 真由美 Taguchi Mayumi)

Six talkers 
Makoto Shindou (新堂 誠 Shindou Makoto)
Shouji Arai (荒井 昭二 Arai Shouji)
Nozomu Kazama (風間 望 Kazama Nozomu)
Tomoharu Hosoda (細田 友晴 Hosoda Tomaharu)
Akemi Iwashita (岩下 明美 Iwahita Akemi)
Reiko Fukuzawa (福沢 玲子 Fukuzawa Reiko)

Other key characters 
Sadao Hino (日野 貞夫 Hino Sadao)
Sanae Motoki (元木 早苗 Motoki Sanae)
Kuroki (黒木 Kuroki)

Reception

On release, Famicom Tsūshin scored the Super Famicom version of the game 25 out of 40.

Franchise 

A sister game, Tsukikomori, was released on the Super Famicom in 1996, using the same gameplay and art style. 

In 2007, a visual novel remake of the game, Apathy - Gakkou de Atta Kowai Hanashi ~Visual Novel Version~, was released. Under a new studio name, Nana Korobi Hachi Korogari, Apathy would become its own franchise of visual novels.

Since 2007, a number of novels and two volumes of a manga have been released in the Gakkou de Atta franchise.

Legacy
The Super Famicom version of the game was later released on the Virtual Console service for the Wii and Wii U in Japan on August 5, 2008, and on August 27, 2014. The PlayStation version was also re-released on the PlayStation Network.

References

External links 
Nana Korobi Hachi Korogari, official website for the current developer. 

1995 video games
Banpresto games
PlayStation (console) games
Super Nintendo Entertainment System games
Japan-exclusive video games
1990s horror video games
Video games developed in Japan
Visual novels
Virtual Console games
Virtual Console games for Wii U